Michael John Charles Balson (9 September 1947 – 30 May 2019) was an English retired professional association football defender who played professionally in England, South Africa and the United States. His career brought him to the United States where he served several decades as a referee as well as a team and league executive. He was a member of both the National Intercollegiate Soccer Officials Association Hall of Fame and the United Soccer Leagues Hall of Fame.

Player
A member of England's oldest family of commercial butchers, As a youth he served as the captain of Colfox School squad. He also had a stint at Bridport FC Balson grew up in England where he began playing for Exeter City in 1966. In 1974, he transferred to South African club, Highlands Park. In 1979, he moved to the United States where he signed with the Atlanta Chiefs of the North American Soccer League. In 1982, he played for the Georgia Generals of the American Soccer League. He played for the Tampa Bay Rowdies during the 1986–87 American Indoor Soccer Association season.

Referee
In 1981, Balson became a member of the National Intercollegiate Soccer Officials Association (NISOA). Over the years, he worked his way into the highest levels of intercollegiate refereeing. In 1984, he became a national referee, working both national junior college and NAIA women's finals. In 1985, he officiated during the NCAA Division I women's tournament. In 1996, he officiated the women's quarterfinals and in 1999, he officiated the NCAA Women's Soccer Championship Final. On the men's side, he oversaw the NCAA quarterfinals from 2000 to 2003 while officiating the ACC men's finals. In 2002, 2004 and 2005, he officiated the NCAA Men's Division I Soccer Championship. He was inducted into the NISOA Hall of Fame in 2006.

Administrator
In 1990, he was part of the establishment of the Atlanta Express of the Sunbelt Independent Soccer League which later became the USISL and eventually the USL. He became a USISL administrator in 1991, the same year he joined the management of the Atlanta Magic. In 1998, he became the general manager of the Atlanta Silverbacks. In 2002, Balson was inducted into the USL Hall of Fame as a Builder.

Personal life and death
Mike was the oldest child of Donald and Joan Balson. He and his wife, Julia, had two children, Melanie and Oliver, and five grandchildren. He and his wife spent over 30 years ministering to prisoners in Atlanta, and also spent 20 years ministering to youth at Georgia Regional Hospital. After a 10-year battle, Balson died on May 30, 2019, from complications associated with Lewy Body Dementia.

References

External links
NASL/ASL stats
1970-1971 Exeter City team photo
Links to the Old Country: A Flowery Branch man has introduced his family's traditional British sausage to the US

1947 births
2019 deaths
American Indoor Soccer Association players
American Soccer League (1933–1983) players
American soccer referees
Association football defenders
Atlanta Chiefs players
English Football League players
English footballers
English expatriate footballers
Exeter City F.C. players
Georgia Generals players
Highlands Park F.C. players
North American Soccer League (1968–1984) players
North American Soccer League (1968–1984) indoor players
People from Bridport
Footballers from Dorset
Tampa Bay Rowdies (1975–1993) players
English expatriate sportspeople in the United States
Expatriate soccer players in the United States